In mathematics, in the realm of abstract algebra, a radical polynomial is a multivariate polynomial over a field that can be expressed as a polynomial in the sum of squares of the variables. That is, if 

 

is a polynomial ring, the ring of radical polynomials is the subring generated by the polynomial 

Radical polynomials are characterized as precisely those polynomials that are invariant under the action of the orthogonal group.

The ring of radical polynomials is a graded subalgebra of the ring of all polynomials.

The standard separation of variables theorem asserts that every polynomial can be expressed as a finite sum of terms, each term being a product of a radical polynomial and a harmonic polynomial. This is equivalent to the statement that the ring of all polynomials is a free module over the ring of radical polynomials.

References

Abstract algebra
Polynomials
Invariant theory